Boophis goudotii (common name: Goudot's bright-eyed frog) is a species of frog in the family Mantellidae. It is endemic to Madagascar where it is widespread on the high plateau of central Madagascar. Records elsewhere are uncertain and many of them represent misidentifications. It is the only Malagasy frog where females are known to be vocal.

Etymology
The specific name goudotii honours Jules Prosper Goudot, a French collector active in Madagascar during the first half of the 19th century.

Description
Males measure  and females typically  in snout–vent length, but they may grow as large as  SVL. Colouration is variable, from almost entirely blackish to yellowish with black spots. Venter is yellowish or orange and may have blackish spots. The iris copper turquoise periphery. The tympanum is distinct. Males have nuptial pads and a subgular vocal sac.

Both males and females are vocal. Calls include irregularly emitted moaning notes, emitted during day and night.

Habitat and conservation
Boophis goudotii is a common species that can be found in rainforests, fields, and disturbed stream sides near slow-moving or stagnant water. They are poor climbers but are sometimes found in trees. Breeding takes place in both permanent and temporary bodies of slow-moving or stagnant water.

While the forest habitat of this species is receding, it tolerates a broad range of habitats. It is also collected for human consumption, but not at levels that would pose a threat.

References

goudotii
Endemic frogs of Madagascar
Amphibians described in 1838
Taxa named by Johann Jakob von Tschudi
Taxonomy articles created by Polbot